A worker is a member of the working class.

Worker may also refer to:

 Laborer, a person who performs unskilled physical labour, especially in construction
 Worker, a member of the workforce
 Designation of workers by collar color lists various categories of workers
 Worker, a minister in the Two by Twos nondenominational Christian sect
 Worker animal, a draught (draft) or service animal
 Worker bee, a non-reproductive female in eusocial bees
 Web worker, a background script run in a web browser

Surname 
 George Worker (born 1989), New Zealand cricketer
 Norman Worker (1927–2005), British comic book writer

Media 
 The Worker (TV series), a 1960s TV sitcom starring Charlie Drake
 Workers (Gong Ren), a 2008 artist's book
 Workers: An Archaeology of the Industrial Age, a 1993 photo essay and book by Sebastião Salgado

See also